Anton Van Schijndel (born January 12, 1960) is a Dutch politician. He was a member of parliament in the House of Representatives from 2005 to 2006, initially for the VVD and later for One NL.

He later became a member of the Forum for Democracy and currently sits with the party on the municipal council of Amsterdam.

Biography
Van Schijndel studied law at the University of Amsterdam and obtained a master's degree in international relations from Columbia University in New York. In the 1990s he worked as a lawyer in New York and Amsterdam. Van Schijndel entered the House of Representatives in 2005 as a member of the VVD, succeeding Jan Rijpstra. In parliament, he focused on matters relating to policing, European rules, the Dutch Constitution, AIVD and national security.

Van Schijndel emerged as a supporter of Rita Verdonk in the party. He was also opposed to Turkey joining the European Union and disagreed with the VVD's course under Mark Rutte. As a result, he left the party to form the  Eerdmans-Van Schijndel Group with former Pim Fortuyn List MP Joost Eerdmans and later founded with the One NL party with Eerdmans and Marco Pastors. The party contested in the 2006 general election but did not win any seats. As a result, Van Schijndel left parliament. He subsequently lived and worked in Brazil setting up partnerships and exchange programs between Dutch and Brazilian universities. In 2017, he made a return to Dutch politics when he was elected to the municipal council of Amsterdam for the Forum for Democracy party.

In March 2022, Van Schijndel was re-elected to the Amsterdam Municipal Council, meeting "Five more years!".

References

1960 births
Living people
21st-century Dutch politicians
University of Amsterdam alumni
Columbia University alumni
Dutch political party founders
Forum for Democracy (Netherlands) politicians
Members of the House of Representatives (Netherlands)
Municipal councillors of Amsterdam
People's Party for Freedom and Democracy politicians